The 1997 Tercera División play-offs to Segunda División B from Tercera División (Promotion play-offs) were the final playoffs for the promotion from 1996–97 Tercera División to 1998–99 Segunda División B. The first four teams in each group (excluding reserve teams) took part in the play-off.

Format

The 68 participating teams were divided into 5 series each made up of 4 groups in the category, with the exception of  Series E , which was only formed by  Group XII . Each series was divided into 4 groups formed by a 1st, a 2nd, a 3rd and a 4th classified from each group, which played a double-round playoff. Each victory was equivalent to 3 points, the tie to 1 point and the defeat to 0 points. The champion of each group obtained the promotion to Second Division B.

The distribution of each series was as follows:

Teams for 1996–97 play-offs

Tables and Results

Group A-1

Group A-2

Group A-3

Group A-4

Group B-1

Group B-2

Group B-3

Group B-4

Group C-1

Group C-2

Group C-3

Group C-4

Group D-1

Group D-2

Group D-3

Group D-4

Group E

Teams Promoted

External links
Futbolme.com
Fútbol Regional

1996-97
play
1997 Spanish football leagues play-offs